Fabián Raphael Estay Silva (born October 5, 1968) is a Chilean former professional footballer who played as a midfielder.

Career
Estay played for club sides in Chile, Switzerland, Greece, Mexico and Colombia.

At international level, he represented Chile at under-20 level in both the 1987 South American Championship and the 1987 FIFA World Youth Championship, where Chile reached the fourth place.

At senior level, he was capped 69 times and scored five goals for the Chile national team between 1990 and 2001, including four games at the 1998 FIFA World Cup. Estay made his debut for the senior national squad on October 17, 1990 in a friendly against Brazil.

Career statistics

International goals

Personal life
Estay has a long-term close friendship with the former fellow footballer Iván Zamorano, what interrupted from 2001 to 2007 due to the fact that Estay stated that Zamorano didn't support him when he was isolated from the América first team by the club leaders. In addition, Zamorano is the godfather of the Estay's daughter, Renata Ivana.

He naturalized Mexican by residence in 2005 and later he made his home in Mexico, working as a football commentator for media such as Fox Sports México.

Honours
Universidad Católica
 Primera División de Chile: 1987
 Copa Chile: 1991

Deportivo Toluca 
 Mexican Primera División: Verano 1998, Verano 1999

Chile
 Copa Expedito Teixeira: 1990
 Canada Cup: 1995

Individual
Mexican Primera División Golden Ball: Winter 1997, Verano 1998, Verano 1999

References

External links
 
 International career details at rsssf
 Fabián Estay at PlaymakerStats

1968 births
Living people
Footballers from Santiago
Chilean footballers
Chile international footballers
Chile under-20 international footballers
Association football midfielders
Club Deportivo Universidad Católica footballers
FC St. Gallen players
Universidad de Chile footballers
Olympiacos F.C. players
Colo-Colo footballers
Deportivo Toluca F.C. players
Club América footballers
Atlante F.C. footballers
Santos Laguna footballers
América de Cali footballers
Club Deportivo Palestino footballers
Chilean Primera División players
Swiss Super League players
Super League Greece players
Liga MX players
Categoría Primera A players
1998 FIFA World Cup players
1991 Copa América players
1993 Copa América players
1995 Copa América players
1997 Copa América players
1999 Copa América players
Chilean expatriate sportspeople in Switzerland
Chilean expatriate sportspeople in Greece
Chilean expatriate sportspeople in Mexico
Chilean expatriate sportspeople in Colombia
Expatriate footballers in Switzerland
Expatriate footballers in Greece
Expatriate footballers in Mexico
Expatriate footballers in Colombia
Naturalized citizens of Mexico
Chilean association football commentators